Jack Billings (born 18 August 1995) is an Australian rules footballer who plays for St Kilda Football Club in the Australian Football League (AFL). Billings played TAC Cup with Oakleigh Chargers and played for Vic Metro in Under 18 Championships. Billings is a two-time Under 18 All-Australian after making the team as an underage player. He was taken by St Kilda with pick #3 in the 2013 National Draft.

AFL career
Billings made his debut in Round 1 of the 2014 AFL season against Melbourne. Billings started as the substitute and had limited game time. After Round 1, Billings was dropped to the VFL for two weeks, kicking five goals for the Sandringham Zebras and was selected in the senior side the next week. In Round 14, 2014, against the West Coast Eagles, Billings kicked three goals and gathered 25 touches, earning that round's AFL Rising Star nomination.

Billings missed large parts of the 2015 and 2016 seasons with a shin injury and ankle injury respectively, but came back strong in the latter part of 2016 to poll votes in the club's best and fairest award in four of the last five games. Billings injured his hamstring in the 2022 pre season competition and also has ramen syndesmosis awareness. He is unlikely to feature much this season and has indicated he would love to play for Essendon in 2023.

Billings played his 50th AFL game against Carlton in Round 8, 2017, managing 30 disposals, 12 marks and 5 goals. In August 2017, Billings signed a two-year contract extension, to remain at the club until the end of 2019.

After a slump in form in the first half of the 2018 season, Billings was dropped from St Kilda's senior team to their VFL affiliate Sandringham. In his first and only VFL game for 2018, Billings collected 53 disposals and was immediately recalled to the senior team.

Prior to the 2019 season, Billings was elevated to St Kilda's leadership group after teammate Dylan Roberton was sidelined with a heart condition. Billings played his 100th AFL game in Round 16, 2019 against North Melbourne and starred with 35 disposals. Billings finished 2019 in fourth place in St Kilda's best and fairest. Billings signed a contract extension with St Kilda in 2019, keeping him at the club until at least the end of 2021. Billings was a restricted free agent in 2021, but despite speculation he would switch clubs, Billings signed a new deal at the end of 2021 which will see him remain at Saints until 2025.

Statistics
Statistics are correct to the end of the 2021 season.

|- style="background:#EAEAEA"
| scope="row" text-align:center | 2014
| 
| 15 || 16 || 14 || 15 || 149 || 84 || 233 || 76 || 28 || 0.8 || 0.9 || 9.3 || 5.2 || 14.5 || 4.7 || 1.7
|- 
| scope="row" text-align:center | 2015
| 
| 15 || 9 || 7 || 6 || 100 || 83 || 183 || 40 || 28 || 0.7 || 0.6 || 11.1 || 9.2 || 20.3 || 4.4 || 3.1
|- style="background:#EAEAEA"
| scope="row" text-align:center | 2016
| 
| 15 || 17 || 6 || 12 || 181 || 162 || 343 || 72 || 56 || 0.3 || 0.7 || 10.6 || 9.5 || 20.1 || 4.2 || 3.2
|- class="sortbottom"
|- 
| scope="row" text-align:center | 2017
| 
| 15 || 22 || 23 || 36 || 254 || 254 || 508 || 122 || 69 || 1.0 || 1.6 || 11.5 || 11.5 || 23.0 || 5.5 || 3.1
|-
| scope=row | 2018 ||  || 15
| 21 || 14 || 19 || 229 || 230 || 459 || 101 || 59 || 0.6 || 0.9 || 10.9 || 10.9 || 21.8 || 4.8 || 2.8
|- style=background:#EAEAEA
| scope=row | 2019 ||  || 15
| 22 || 13 || 10 || 316 || 250 || 566 || 132 || 65 || 0.5 || 0.4 || 14.3 || 11.3 || 25.7 || 6.0 || 2.9 || 1
|-
| scope=row | 2020 ||  || 15
| 19 || 11 || 6 || 205 || 147 || 352 || 78 || 47 || 0.5 || 0.3 || 10.7 || 7.7 || 18.5 || 4.1 || 2.4 || 2
|- style=background:#EAEAEA
| scope=row | 2021 ||  || 15
|| 18 || 14 || 14 || 218 || 143 || 361 || 113 || 35 || 0.7 || 0.7 || 12.1 || 7.9 || 20.0 || 6.2 || 1.9 || 2
|- style="background:#EAEAEA"
! colspan=3| Career
! 144
! 102
! 118
! 1652
! 1353
! 3005
! 734
! 387
! 0.7
! 0.8
! 11.4
! 9.3
! 20.8
! 5.0
! 2.6
|}

Notes

References

External links

1995 births
Living people
Oakleigh Chargers players
Australian rules footballers from Victoria (Australia)
St Kilda Football Club players
People educated at Scotch College, Melbourne
Sandringham Football Club players